Bisphenol AF (BPAF) is a fluorinated organic compound that is an analogue of bisphenol A in which the two methyl groups are replaced with trifluoromethyl groups. It exists as a white to light-gray powder.

Biological and Chemical Action

Bisphenol AF is an endocrine disrupting chemical.
Whereas BPA binds with human estrogen-related receptor gamma (ERR-γ), BPAF all but ignores ERR-γ. Instead, BPAF activates ERR-α and binds to and disables ERR-β.

The chemical shifts in 1H, 13C and 19F NMR spectroscopy are given in the literature.

Applications
Bisphenol AF is used as a crosslinking agent for certain fluoroelastomers and as a monomer for polyimides, polyamides, polyesters, polycarbonate copolymers and other specialty polymers. Polymers containing Bisphenol AF are useful in specialties such as high-temperature composites and electronic materials. Industries include cosmetics, chemical manufacturing, production of metals and rubber. It can also be a plastic additive.

See also
 Bisphenol A
 Bisphenol S

References

2,2-Bis(4-hydroxyphenyl)propanes
Endocrine disruptors
Trifluoromethyl compounds
Plasticizers